Les Vallées de la Vanne (literally The Valleys of the Vanne) is a commune in the Yonne department of central France. The municipality was established on 1 January 2016 by merger of the former communes of Theil-sur-Vanne, Chigy and Vareilles.

See also 
Communes of the Yonne department

References 

Communes of Yonne